Orophochilus is a genus of flowering plants belonging to the family Acanthaceae.

Its native range is Peru.

Species
Species:
 Orophochilus stipulaceus Lindau

References

Acanthaceae
Acanthaceae genera